In multivariable calculus, an iterated integral is the result of applying integrals to a function of more than one variable (for example  or ) in a way that each of the integrals considers some of the variables as given constants. If this is done, the result is the iterated integral 

It is key for the notion of iterated integrals that this is different, in principle, from the multiple integral

In general, although these two can be different, Fubini's theorem states that under specific conditions, they are equivalent. 

The alternative notation for iterated integrals

is also used.

In the notation that uses parentheses, iterated integrals are computed following the operational order indicated by the parentheses starting from the most inner integral outside. In the alternative notation, writing , the innermost integrand is computed first.

Examples

A simple computation

For the iterated integral

the integral

is computed first and then the result is used to compute the integral with respect to y.

This example omits the constants of integration.  After the first integration with respect to x, we would rigorously need to introduce a "constant" function of y.  That is, If we were to differentiate this function with respect to x, any terms containing only y would vanish, leaving the original integrand.  Similarly for the second integral, we would introduce a "constant" function of x, because we have integrated with respect to y.  In this way, indefinite integration does not make very much sense for functions of several variables.

The order is important
The order in which the integrals are computed is important in iterated integrals, particularly when the integrand is not continuous on the domain of integration. Examples in which the different orders lead to different results are usually for complicated functions as the one that follows.

Define the sequence  such that . Let  be a sequence of continuous functions not vanishing in the interval  and zero elsewhere, such that  for every . Define

In the previous sum, at each specific , at most one term is different from zero.
For this function it happens that

See also

References

Integrals